John Mulimba is a Ugandan politician, member of parliament representing Samia Bugwe constituency who currently serves as Minister of State for Foreign Affairs (Regional Co-operation).

Political career 
Mulimba was elected to the Samia Bugwe constituency seat in the parliament in 2011 on the ticket of National Resistance Movement and served until 2016 when he lost his seat to Gideon Onyango. Mulimba was voted out in protest against his opulent lifestyle and negligence of his constituents. He owns Jogo fm radio station in Busia and drives around his constituency in monster pickup. He reclaimed the seat in the 2021 and was appointed Minister of State for Foreign Affairs (Regional Co-operation).

References 

Living people
21st-century Ugandan politicians
Members of the Parliament of Uganda
National Resistance Movement politicians
Year of birth missing (living people)